The ABC Under-22 Championship 1996 is the 2nd edition of the ABC's championship for young men basketball. The games were held at Shanghai from November 1–9, 1996.

Preliminary round

Group A

Group B

Group C

Group D

Quarterfinals

Group I

Group II

Group III

Group IV

Classification 5th–16th

15th place

13th place

11th place

9th place

7th place

5th place

Final round

Semifinals

3rd place

Final

Final standing

Awards

References
 Results

FIBA Asia Under-20 Championship
1996–97 in Asian basketball
1996–97 in Chinese basketball
International basketball competitions hosted by China